Kal Alexander Naismith (born 18 February 1992) is a Scottish professional footballer who plays a versatile role for Championship club Bristol City.

A Rangers youth graduate, Naismith made his breakthrough into the first team in the 2012–13 season, after loan spells at Cowdenbeath and Partick Thistle. He has represented Scotland at under-16 and under-17 level. He can play as an out and out striker, as a winger, in midfield, and in defence as a left back or centre back. His main attributes are his ball control and versatility.

Club career

Rangers
Naismith was sent on loan to Cowdenbeath and Partick Thistle during the 2011–12 season. On his return from loan Naismith made his debut as a substitute on 29 July 2012, in a 2–1 win over Brechin City in the Challenge Cup.

He scored his first goal for Rangers against Forres Mechanics in the Second Round of the 2012 Scottish Cup. On 9 August 2013 he mutually agreed with Rangers to terminate his contract.

Cowdenbeath (loan)
Naismith joined Scottish Second Division club Cowdenbeath on loan at the end of August 2011. He made his debut on 10 September against East Fife, going on to score his first goals for the club on 24 September scoring both goals in their 2–1 win over Albion Rovers. With matches limited due to call offs his last game came on 10 December against Arbroath.

Partick Thistle (loan)
On 5 January 2012 Naismith joined Scottish First Division club Partick Thistle on loan until the end of the season, however was unable to play against Queen of the South in the Scottish Cup that weekend as he was cup tied having played for Cowdenbeath earlier in the season. He made his debut on 13 January playing from the start in their 1–0 defeat to Hamilton Academical.

Accrington Stanley
In the 2013 summer, Naismith was given a trial at Accrington Stanley, completing a switch to them on a free transfer shortly after.
 He made his debut for the club on 10 August, starting in a 2–2 home draw against Portsmouth.

Naismith scored his first goal for Stanley on 22 October 2013, netting the winner in a 2–1 home success over Bristol Rovers. He also scored braces against Torquay United and Mansfield Town, finishing the season with ten goals in 38 appearances.

Naismith was also an undisputed starter for the club in 2014–15, scoring four goals in 35 games.

Portsmouth
On 28 May 2015, Naismith signed a three-year deal with fellow League Two side Portsmouth, for an undisclosed fee.

Naismith scored 13 goals in the season which saw Portsmouth finish as champions of League Two, clinched on the last day of the season.

At the end of the 2017–18 season, Portsmouth announced that he rejected a new deal from the club, deciding to pursue other options elsewhere.

Wigan Athletic
On 30 May 2018, Naismith signed a three-year deal with Championship club Wigan Athletic. He scored his first goal for Wigan in a 4–2 loss at Sheffield United on 27 October 2018.
On 7 January 2021, Naismith left Wigan by mutual consent.

Luton Town
On 15 January 2021, Naismith signed for Championship side Luton Town on a permanent deal. He scored his first goal for Luton on 27 February 2021 in a 3–2 win against Sheffield Wednesday. On 15 January 2022, he scored a last minute goal in a 3–2 win over Bournemouth. Despite being offered a new contract with Luton Town, Naismith left the club at the end of the 2021–22 season.

Bristol City
On 27 May 2022, Naismith signed a three year deal with Championship side Bristol City on a free transfer. He scored his first goal for Bristol City in an EFL Cup win over Coventry City on 10 August 2022.

International career
Naismith has represented Scotland at under-16 level making his debut against Wales on 5 October 2007. His first goal came on 29 November against England. He later represented the under-17 team making eight appearances.

Career statistics

Personal life
On 20 September 2010, Naismith and fellow Rangers player Kyle Hutton, were abducted in Edinburgh by two men and driven around the city in Hutton's car before they were dumped in the Niddrie area of Edinburgh. Naismith and Hutton were then mugged as the thieves stole the car. Later, both the thieves were convicted and prosecuted, and the car was retrieved.

Honours
Rangers
Scottish Third Division: 2012–13
Portsmouth FC
EFL League Two: 2016–17
Individual

 Luton Town Player of the Season: 2021–22

References

External links

1992 births
Living people
Footballers from Glasgow
Scottish footballers
Scotland youth international footballers
Association football forwards
Rangers F.C. players
Cowdenbeath F.C. players
Partick Thistle F.C. players
Accrington Stanley F.C. players
Portsmouth F.C. players
Hartlepool United F.C. players
Wigan Athletic F.C. players
Luton Town F.C. players
Bristol City F.C. players
Scottish Football League players
English Football League players